Amanda Zhao Wei ( – October 2002) was a Chinese student in Vancouver, British Columbia, Canada, who was murdered in October 2002. Zhao was studying English at Coquitlam College when she was reported missing on October 9, 2002, and her body was found inside a suitcase by hikers near Stave Lake on October 20, 2002, where an autopsy revealed that Zhao had been strangled to death.

Zhao's boyfriend Li Ang (李昂) was the prime suspect. Li was arrested in China and charged by a Beijing court for Zhao's murder. Li was initially given a life sentence, but this was changed to a seven-year imprisonment.

Amanda Zhao's murder and the subsequent investigation highlighted issues with the co-operation of Canada and China in matters of justice, and issues of jurisdiction within Canadian law enforcement.

Background

Investigation
The two murder suspects in the case, Li Ang (李昂) and Zhang Han (张瀚), were arrested in China in the summer of 2009. The prime suspect Li Ang, who was Zhao's boyfriend at the time of murder, was initially in Canada when Zhao's body was found. Li was a Chinese national and a computer science student at Simon Fraser University, located in the Vancouver area.

Zhang Han, who was Li's cousin, was also implicated in the case. He later confessed that he had helped Li dispose of Zhao's body and helped Li travel back to China after the murder. Zhang's confession led to him being charged as an accessory after the fact in Zhao's murder. However, he was later acquitted by the British Columbia Supreme Court because the confession had been improperly obtained. Zhao, Li, and Zhang shared a basement apartment in Burnaby at the time of murder.

Eleven days before the body was found, Li reported to police that Zhao was missing after she went to buy groceries at the local Safeway store. However, three days after Zhao's body was found, Li returned to China.

Li was initially questioned by the RCMP on the case, but it was not until seven months after the murder that the RCMP issue a warrant for his arrest, and is being charged with second-degree murder in absentia by the Canadian government.

In 2004, Li had been taken into custody by the Chinese government, but was later released due to lack of evidence.

Li was arrested by Chinese authorities again and convicted in September 2012, and sentenced to life in prison. Zhang was released and is not scheduled to be tried. In 2014, Li's sentence was changed by the Supreme court of Beijing to 7 years. The original first degree murder charge has been changed to secondary degree murder charge as the Supreme court of Beijing ruled that Zhao was accidentally killed by Li during a pillow play fight. The court decision was controversial as the court ruled without any new evidence.

Aftermath
The arrests for Amanda Zhao's murder took many years to complete, and responsibility was found to be mainly because the Canadian government is reluctant in giving evidence of murder cases to China, as Chinese authorities allow for capital punishment for murder, which is illegal in Canada. On October 13, 2009, Secretary of State for Multiculturalism Jason Kenney said that China's capital punishment policy has been a problem in the case.

In 2023, Li (using the alias Leo Li) entered New Zealand using a fake identity, requesting refugee status.

See also
List of solved missing person cases
Murder of Cecilia Zhang, similar case in Toronto
Murder of Shao Tong, similar case in U.S.
Trial of Xiao Zhen, similar case in New Zealand
Zhang Hongjie, similar case in Australia

References

Sources
 Canadian Press News Report
 CTV News Report. 
 National Post News Report
 Global News Report. 
 cbc.ca News Report. 
 Ming Pao Chinese News Report. 
 Canada.com News Report
 Straight.com Blog. 

2000s missing person cases
2002 murders in Canada
Canada–China relations
Chinese murder victims
Deaths by strangulation
Deaths from asphyxiation
Female murder victims
Formerly missing people
Missing person cases in Canada
Murder in British Columbia
Women in British Columbia